The Opheim Hills,  el. , is a set of hills northwest of Opheim, Montana in Valley County, Montana, United States.

See also
 List of mountain ranges in Montana

Notes

Mountain ranges of Montana
Landforms of Valley County, Montana